= Anil Mehta (politician) =

Anil Mehta (born 26 September 1984) is a Bhartiya Janta Party (BJP) politician and an Indian advocate who has held various legal positions in the governments of Haryana and Chandigarh. He served as Deputy Advocate General of Haryana from 2014 to 2018 and subsequently joined the Chandigarh Administration as Additional Standing Counsel in 2018. In November 2021, he was appointed Senior Standing Counsel for the Union Territory of Chandigarh before the Punjab and Haryana High Court, a position he held until 2024. He has also represented the Directorate of Enforcement (ED) before the Punjab and Haryana High Court and served as a Special Public Prosecutor in cases under the Prevention of Money Laundering Act (PMLA).

== Early life and education ==
Mehta belongs to a Gaur Brahmin family of District Ambala. He was born in 1984 to Smt. Suresh Mehta & Capt. Kul Bhushan Mehta at Military Hospital, Ambala Cantt, although he belongs to a village named Badhauli in Tehsil Naraingarh, District Ambala, in Haryana. His father has served in the Indian Army for 34 years and after his retirement, is presently settled at District Ambala only.

He completed his school education at Army School, Ambala, in the science stream and was also the house captain of his house in school. Although after completing his intermediate, he chose to study law over engineering and was admitted to one of the renowned & prestigious colleges, Army Institute of Law at Mohali, Punjab. He is also an alumnus of the London School of Economics and Political Science, wherein he studied corporate law and governance.

He joined the Bar Association of Punjab & Haryana High Court in July 2008 and has been a practicing lawyer since then, practicing on the civil, criminal & corporate sides. He is also a managing partner of a law firm named Lex Solutions, having its offices in Chandigarh and Delhi.

== Career ==
Anil Mehta was appointed Deputy Advocate General of Haryana in 2014 and served in the position until 2018. At the end of his tenure, he joined the Chandigarh Administration as Additional Standing Counsel in 2018.

In November 2021, Mehta was appointed Senior Standing Counsel for the Union Territory of Chandigarh in the Punjab and Haryana High Court for a three-year term. The appointment followed a selection process conducted by a committee constituted by the Chandigarh Administration.

In January 2023, Mehta was appointed Special Counsel for the Directorate of Enforcement to represent the agency before the Punjab and Haryana High Court. He was also appointed Special Public Prosecutor before the Special Court under the Prevention of Money Laundering Act in Chandigarh.

His tenure as Senior Standing Counsel for the Chandigarh Administration concluded in 2024.
